William Wallace Morris (born 6 March 1918, date of death unknown) was an Australian cricketer. He played in 34 first-class matches for Queensland between 1945 and 1950. Morris is deceased.

See also
 List of Queensland first-class cricketers

References

External links
 

1918 births
Year of death missing
Australian cricketers
Queensland cricketers
Cricketers from Sydney